Mercedes Gilbert ( – ) was an African-American actress, novelist, and poet. She was a native of Jacksonville, Florida, and attended Edward Waters College, where she had originally trained to be a nurse, before coming to New York and entering the entertainment profession, first as a songwriter and then as a stage actress.

Career 
She was known for playing Zipporah, the wife of Moses, in the original touring production of "The Green Pastures" in 1930. She was still performing in 1950, appearing on Broadway in a new version of the play "Tobacco Road," with an all-black cast. Gilbert appeared on the screen four times: first in the film The Call of His People in year 1921, next in the film Body and Soul in year 1925, in the film Moon Over Harlem in 1939 as Jackie's mother, and finally in the episode "The Green Dress" of the TV series Lights Out.  She also appeared on radio, most notably in a 1943 tribute to black women in America called "Heroines in Bronze." She played the role of Sojourner Truth.  She performed occasionally on other radio programs, as well as writing and producing several radio skits. In the mid-1940s, she performed a one-woman show at historically black colleges across the United States. In addition, she was the author of a 1938 novel "Aunt Sara's Wooden God."

Death 
Ms. Gilbert died at the age of 57, on Sunday March 1 in Queens General Hospital in New York after a three-week illness. She was survived by her husband Arthur J. Stevenson and a brother Earl Gough who was also an actor.

External links and References 

American film actresses
American silent film actresses
African-American actresses
1894 births
1952 deaths
20th-century American actresses
20th-century African-American women
20th-century African-American people